SEAir International is an all-cargo airline headquartered in Clark, Philippines. The airline is one of the two all cargo airlines operating in the country. Its main base is Clark International Airport in Pampanga, Philippines.

History 
The airline was established as SEAir Inc., in 1995 and started operations in the same year. Its franchise however, was granted by Congress only on May 13, 2009 through Republic Act No. 9517.
 
After SEAIR's rebranding to Tigerair Philippines in 2013 and the acquisition of Tigerair Philippines by Cebu Pacific in 2014, SEAIR International was formed in 2012 to cater to airports that cannot be reached by jet aircraft flying to former destinations such as Godofredo P. Ramos Airport in Aklan and Puerto Princesa Airport in Palawan as well as chartered flights to Incheon International Airport in Incheon, South Korea.

Fleet

Current fleet
As of 2021, SEAir International's fleet consists of the following aircraft:

Former fleet

References

External links

 Official website

Airlines of the Philippines
Airlines established in 1995
Airlines formerly banned in the European Union
Companies based in Angeles City
Philippine companies established in 1995